Jeppe Prætorius (4 July 1745  – 6 April 1823) was a Danish merchant, slave trader and shipowner.

Biography

Prætorius was born in Skærbæk near Tønder in Jutland. He moved to Copenhagen where he became bookkeeper for the Danish West India Company in 1796 before establishing his own trading house. He mainly traded on the Danish colonies and was involved in the liquidisation of Østersøiske-Guineiske Selskab in 1787. His fleet had a total ship tonnage of more than 200 kommercelæster (just over 500 t) in 1797. The war with England in 1807 hit his business hard but he managed to keep it afloat. On 31 August 1807 HMS Niobe and  captured his ship  (King of Ashanti). Between 1797 and 1 January 1803, when the abolition of Danish participation in the trans-Atlantic slave trade took effect, she had made three voyages carrying slaves from West Africa to the Danish West Indies.

In 1802 Prætorius was elected to a leading post in Grosserersocietetet.

Property

He purchased the property at Overgaden neden Vandet 39 in 1792.

Aftermath
Præstotius' two sons, Henrik Frederik Prætorius (30 March 1783 – 24 February 1862) Jacob Christian Prætorius (12 December 1784 /mdasj;  23 March 1859), took over the company after his death. Henrik Frederik Prætorius was later elected to the board of representatives of Bank of Denmark and served as its bank manager under L. N. Hvidt. He was also a member of Stænderforsamlingen in Roskilde in  1838, 1842 and 1844.

References

External links
 Source
 Source
 Source

18th-century Danish businesspeople
19th-century Danish businesspeople
Danish merchants
Danish slave traders
1745 births
1823 deaths
People from Tønder Municipality